The Achilles was an English shaft drive voiturette manufactured by B Thompson & Co. in Frome, Somerset between 1903 and 1908.

A range of cars were advertised, mostly with single-cylinder engines by Aster and De Dion. Other mechanical parts were also bought in, and it seems likely that only the bodies were originated by Achilles. At least 5 different models were produced including the 8 hp, 9 hp and 12 hp.

This car is notably seen in the French comic book Achille Talon, created by Michel Regnier (known by the pseudonym Greg), for the Pilote redaction.

References

David Filsell, "Achilles", in G.N. Georgano, ed., The Complete Encyclopedia of Motorcars 1885-1968  (New York: E.P. Dutton and Co., 1974), pp. 26.

Defunct motor vehicle manufacturers of England
Companies based in Somerset